UFC 84: Ill Will was a mixed martial arts event held by the Ultimate Fighting Championship (UFC) on May 24, 2008, at the MGM Grand Garden Arena in Las Vegas, Nevada.

Background
The card featured the return of Sean Sherk, who was suspended and stripped of his UFC Lightweight Championship after he tested positive for steroids at UFC 73.

This event also marked the last appearance of Tito Ortiz in the UFC for well over a year, as he was at the end of his contract and due to his feud with Dana White was not expected to re-sign at the time.

This event also marked the UFC debut of future UFC Interim Heavyweight Champion Shane Carwin.

This event was awarded Sherdog's 2008 Event of the Year.

Results

Bonus awards
At the end of this event, the UFC awarded $75,000 to each of the fighters who received one of these three awards.

Fight of the Night: Wilson Gouveia vs. Goran Reljic
Knockout of the Night: Wanderlei Silva
Submission of the Night: Rousimar Palhares

Reported payout
B.J. Penn ($250,000) def. Sean Sherk ($35,000)
Wanderlei Silva ($150,000) def. Keith Jardine ($10,000)
Lyoto Machida ($100,000) def. Tito Ortiz ($210,000)
Goran Reljic ($6,000) def. Wilson Gouveia ($18,000)
Sokoudjou ($80,000) def. Kazuhiro Nakamura ($20,000)
Thiago Silva ($50,000) def. Antonio Mendes ($4,000)
Rousimar Palhares ($10,000) def. Ivan Salaverry ($20,000)
Yoshiyuki Yoshida ($12,000) def. Jon Koppenhaver ($8,000)
Rich Clementi ($40,000) def. Terry Etim ($10,000)
Dong Hyun Kim ($40,000) def. Jason Tan ($3,000)
Shane Carwin ($12,000) def. Christian Wellisch ($10,000)

This does not include fighter bonuses

Total: $1,098,000

See also
 Ultimate Fighting Championship
 List of UFC champions
 List of UFC events
 2008 in UFC

References

External links
Official UFC 84 Fight Card
Official UFC 84 Site

Ultimate Fighting Championship events
2008 in mixed martial arts
Mixed martial arts in Las Vegas
2008 in sports in Nevada
MGM Grand Garden Arena